Ozbekiston Ovozi, also spelt as Uzbekistan Ovozi, is an Uzbek language newspaper published from Uzbekistan. It is run by the government. The newspaper is translated to be “The Voice of Uzbekistan”.

References

External links
 Ozbekiston Ovozi 
Ozbekiston Ovozi Official Site

Newspapers published in Uzbekistan
Publications with year of establishment missing